The National Bank of Czechoslovakia was the central bank of Czechoslovakia between 1926 and 1939. Between 1939 and 1945, its activities were divided into the National Bank for Bohemia and Moravia in Prague in the Protectorate of Bohemia and Moravia and the Slovak National Bank in the Slovak Republic. The National Bank was re-established in reunified Czechoslovakia in 1945, and in 1950 renamed State Bank of Czechoslovakia.

On , the State Bank of Czechoslovakia was replaced by its two successor entities, the Czech National Bank in the Czech Republic and the National Bank of Slovakia in Slovakia.

Background

Following the collapse of the Habsburg Monarchy and the Czechoslovak declaration of independence in October 1918, monetary authority under the First Czechoslovak Republic was initially exercised by the Banking Office of the Ministry of Finance.

The Czechoslovak economy suffered a major economic downturn between 1921 and 1923. In response to the economic decline, the Finance Minister at the time, Alois Rašín, implemented strong deflationary policies in an attempt to prevent further hyperinflation. While Rašín's policies most likely averted hyperinflation as extreme as happened in Austria and Germany, public opinion was hostile to the Ministry of Finance.

1926–1939
The National Bank of Czechoslovakia was established in 1926. In the following years, the country experienced a period of economic prosperity, including in terms of manufacturing activity, currency strength, and general economic growth. The Czechoslovak banking sector grew to over 100 banks and more than 200 credit unions.

In the aftermath of the Wall Street Crash of 1929, the Czechoslovakian economy entered depression. The National Bank originally followed a deflationary monetary policy, which exacerbated the problems. The National bank also eliminated the ability to convert currency into gold and competitive devaluation. The National Bank's policies generated social discontent. Minister of Finance Karel Engliš attempted to end the deflationary policy by devaluating the koruna, while maintaining the gold standard. In opposition to Engliš, the Social Democrats proposed to leave the gold standard. Political parties proposed different solutions for recovery, which caused stalemate. Ultimately, the gold standard was abandoned, and Engliš resigned on 16 April 1931. Despite political turmoil and difficulties with the central bank, Czechoslovakia began a slow rebound in 1934.

One of the important outcomes of the Great Depression was the increase in support for government intervention in the economy. Price support systems increased in popularity, which instituted moderating prices, wages and currency. The government, now with more control over the central bank, lowered interest rates and devalued the koruna. Meanwhile, support for Communism grew among the Czechoslovak public.

1939–1945
In March 1939, Adolf Hitler fostered the secession of Slovakia and took over the Protectorate of Bohemia and Moravia, and the National Bank was consequently divided into two separate entities respectively in Bratislava and Prague. More than 45 metric tons of the National Bank's gold reserves was seized by Deutsche Reichsbank.  acted as Minister of Finance in Prague during Nazi occupation.

1945–1992
After the end of the war, the two central banks were reunified under their former name. Between 1945 and 1948, the banking system underwent nationalization in several phases, under Soviet influence and with the increasingly dominant influence of the Communist Party of Czechoslovakia. On , the Central bank was fully nationalized and renamed the State Bank of Czechoslovakia.

Under communism, the role of the State Bank expanded to that of a commercial bank, central bank, and investment bank. The institution was a supervisory agent of the government, in charge of planning for the economic needs of the country. The State Bank granted credit to the individuals that needed capital to meet their business's economic expectations. It also acted as the supervisor of the other state-owned banks, including two savings bank and the Commercial Bank of Czechoslovakia which was in charge of foreign currency exchange. In 1958, the State Bank took control over all capital allocation.

Leadership

Ministers of Finance between 1919 and 1926
 Alois Rašín, March 1919 – July 1919
 , July 1919 – October 1919
 , October 1919 – May 1920
 Karel Engliš, May 1920 – March 1921
 , March 1921 – September 1921
 , October 1921 – October 1922
 Alois Rašín, October 1922 – January 1923
 , February 1923 – November 1925
 Karel Engliš, December 1925 – January 1926

Governors of the National Bank of Czechoslovakia
 , January 1926 – February 1934
 Karel Engliš, February 1934 – February 1939

Governor of the National Bank for Bohemia and Moravia in Prague
 , 1939 – 1945

Governor of the Slovak National Bank
 Imrich Karvaš, 1939 – September 1944

Governor of the National Bank of Czechoslovakia
 , June 1945 – July 1950

General Directors of the State Bank of Czechoslovakia
 , July 1950 – February 1954
 Jaroslav Kabeš, February 1954 – August 1957
 , August 1957 – October 1969
 , October 1969 – June 1981
 , June 1981 – November 1988
 , November 1988 – December 1989
 Josef Tošovský, December 1989 – December 1992

Branches

See also
 Austro-Hungarian Bank
 Gosbank

References

Former central banks
Defunct Banks of Czechoslovakia